Patrick Loch Otieno Lumumba (born 17 July 1962) is a Kenyan who served as the Director of the Kenya Anti-Corruption Commission from September 2010 to August 2011. Since 2014, Lumumba has been the Director of The Kenya School of Law. An eloquent lawyer, Lumumba earned his LL.B and LL.M degrees at the University of Nairobi. His LL.M thesis is titled National Security And Fundamental Rights. Additionally, Lumumba holds a PhD in Laws of the Sea from the University of Ghent in Belgium. Lumumba is a staunch Pan-Africanist and has delivered several powerful speeches alluding to or about African solutions to African problems.

He is an admirer of Kwame Nkrumah the first president of Ghana ,Patrice Lumumba and Thomas Sankara, the assassinated revolutionary leaders of the Democratic Republic of the Congo and Burkina Faso, respectively. Lumumba has referred to and quoted them several times in his speeches. Lumumba is also remembered for his emotion-laden and energetic speech in Uganda at the third Anti-Corruption Convention. On August 28, 2015, the PAV Ansah Foundation invited Lumumba to speak at the 2015 PAVA Forum on "Good Governance and tiop, Whither Africa?"

2015 PAVA Forum
At the lecture, Lumumba expressed his serious concern about the energy crises that African leaders have allowed to reach such a devastating stage. Lumumba also talked about the issue of African youth fleeing the continent. Lumumba blamed them on the economic hardships and the "misgovernment" from their leaders. Lumumba encouraged African leaders to rise to the challenge of changing the fortunes of the continent.
In 2017, Lumumba gave a moving speech to youths in Kenya on importance of making bold choice at The Fearless conference 2017.

Anti-Corruption Tsar
Lumumba served as the Director of Kenya Anti-Corruption Commission for less than a year and was dismissed under controversial circumstances.  Lumumba attempted "to slay the elusive corruption dragon to no avail", and "will especially be remembered for [his] contributions in fighting corruption in an environment where all odds were against [him]".

Personal life 
In his spare time, Lumumba is known to practice martial arts and is a third dan black belt in Shotokan Karate. He claims to have practiced martial arts since 1975.

Books
Lumumba has written several books on law and politics:

 Kenya's Quest for a Constitution: The Postponed Promise
 Call for political hygiene in Kenya
 An Outline of Criminal Procedure in Kenya
 Judicial review in Kenya
 Call for Hygiene in Kenyan Politics
 The Quotable P.L.O. Lumumba
 Judicial review of administrative actions in Kenya
 A handbook on criminal procedure in Kenya
 Stolen Moments
 The Constitution of Kenya, 2010: An Introductory Commentary
 Mhhh Afrika!!!
 Ang'o marach?

References

External links
Speech by Prof PLO Lumumba at the 3rd Anti Corruption Convention
Speech By Kenyan's Prof. Lumumba At The Nigerian Legislature Conference On Anti-Corruption
Capital Talk PLO Lumbumba Part 1
Prof Lumumba Speaks at the 2nd ASARECA GeneralAssembly
PLO Lumumba CV (MS Word format)

1962 births
Living people
20th-century Kenyan lawyers
University of Nairobi alumni
Ghent University alumni
Kenya School of Law alumni
21st-century Kenyan lawyers
Fellows of the African Academy of Sciences
Honorary Fellows of the African Academy of Sciences